Raju Gari Gadhi 2 is a 2017 Indian Telugu-language comedy horror film, produced by Prasad V. Potluri under PVP Cinema, Matinee Entertainment, OAK Entertainments banner, and directed by Ohmkar. It stars Nagarjuna Akkineni, Samantha Ruth Prabhu, and Seerat Kapoor, with music composed by S. Thaman. The film is a sequel to Raju Gari Gadhi (2015) and second installment in Raju Gari Gadhi franchise. It is a remake of the Malayalam film Pretham (2016).

Plot
The film begins with three youngsters Ashwin (Ashwin Babu), Kishore (Vennela Kishore), and Praveen (Praveen), who are friends from college days, deciding to lead a life by investing in a resort business. As they start the business, everything goes smoothly until they begin to witness paranormal activities in the resort, making their lives tougher. Immediately, they contact a nearby Church Father (Naresh), but it fails miserably, and their fear of that ghost increases. The Father suggests they approach a world-renowned mentalist named Rudra (Nagarjuna Akkineni) who has parlor tricks, mental tenacity to make clever guesses, special powers of contacting with the spirits, and also assists the Police Department as a human lie detector with his cold reading techniques. Rudra decides to solve the mystery in the resort. Beyond a shadow of the doubt, he finds out that it is a soul of a girl Amrutha (Samantha Ruth Prabhu), who is seeking answers for her death. Rudra ensures Amrutha that he will help her. 

So, she starts revealing her past. Amrutha was a bright and intelligent student who has grown up with values and norms given by her father Parandhamaiah (Rao Ramesh). Once, she goes out on a college excursion when someone secretly films her while bathing in the same resort which is purchased by three youngsters and uploaded on the internet, which led to her father’s suicide. After that, Amrutha also committed suicide due to the pain caused by society. Now, Rudra starts his investigation to catch the real culprit. At last, he cracks the mystery it is Kiran (Abhinaya), the daughter of Chandra Shekar (Devan), who is the Vice Chancellor of the Institution. The reason behind Kiran's deed is jealousy, about Amrutha's popularity and her love interest Nandu's (Nandu) fondness towards Amrutha. After knowing the truth, Amrutha tries to kill Kiran, but Rudra obstructs her way by remembering the morals taught by her father and making her soul rest in peace. Finally, the movie ends with the three youngsters running their resort successfully with a caution that cell phones are not allowed and Rudra moving towards a new mission.

Cast

Nagarjuna Akkineni as Rudra
Samantha Ruth Prabhu as Amrutha
Seerat Kapoor as Suhanisa
Abhinaya as Kiran
Rao Ramesh as Parandhamaiah 
Ashwin Babu as Ashwin
Vennela Kishore as Kishore 
Praveen as Praveen
Vidyullekha Raman as Bellam Sridevi
Naresh as Father
Avinash as Priest
Devan as Vice Chancellor Chandra Shekar
Nandu as Nandu
Tejaswi Madivada as Bala 
Narayana Rao as Master
Annapurna as Varalakshmi
Satya Krishnan as Lecturer
Mukhtar Khan as Commissioner Sarathchandra
Ravi Varma as Satti 
Shakalaka Shankar as Bala Yesu
Geetha Singh as Nimmy
Baby Lasya as Amrutha (child)
 Shatru as Land Grabbing Head

Soundtrack

Production 
Raju Gari Gadhi 2, a new project with Nagarjuna Akkineni in the lead was launched on 27 November 2016 at Annapurna Studios, K. Raghavendra Rao gave the clap for the first scene, producer Prasad V Potluri switched on the camera while Omkar directed the first shot. The principal photography commenced in February 2017 in Hyderabad. The first look of the film was launched on 29 August 2017 on Nagarjuna's birthday and the trailer has launched on 20 September 2017, on eve of ANR's birthday. The resort shown in the film is Le Pondy at Pondicherry.

Reception

Critical reception 
Times of India gave 3 out of 5 stars stating "The linear narrative and lack of spooks in what’s touted to be horror-comdey not withstanding, Raju Gari Gadhi 2 makes for a passable weekend watch".

Sequels 
It is sequel to Raju Gari Gadhi which was released in 2015.  Eventually the third installment Raju Gari Gadhi 3 was released on 18 October 2019.

See also
Highest-grossing Telugu franchises and film series

References 

2017 horror films
2010s Telugu-language films
Indian comedy horror films
Indian sequel films
Films scored by Thaman S
Telugu remakes of Malayalam films
Indian horror film remakes
Films directed by Ohmkar